The Tragedy of Flight 103: The Inside Story is a 1990 television drama film directed by Leslie Woodhead, written by Michael Eaton, and starring Ned Beatty, Peter Boyle, Harry Ditson, Vincent Gardenia, Timothy West and Michael Wincott. The film is about the bombing of Pan Am Flight 103 over Lockerbie, Scotland in 1988. It premiered in the United Kingdom on ITV on November 26, 1990, and in the United States on HBO on December 9, 1990.

Plot

Yossi Langotsky packs a fake bomb in a suitcase and attempts to check in for a Pan Am flight only to find out that he is late. However, the check in officer accepts an under-the-table payment bribe to allow Langotsky's suitcase to be checked in. Once the suitcase is loaded, Langotsky calls Pan Am CEO Edward Acker to inform him of the fake bomb being placed onto one of the flights. Acker informs him that he doesn't want this incident to happen again and that it is not the right way to question security procedures on airlines.

At the Pan Am headquarters in New York, Acker meets with his high-ranking executives, one of them being the new vice-president for aviation security Frederick Ford, and reveals a plan to make Pan Am the safest and reliable airline, with its new security subsidiary named "Alert". Ford, who is to head "Alert", proposes changes with some of their elements based on El Al's security but is rebuffed by other executives, who plan to do it the American way as Pan Am is an American airline. Ford and Harry Pizer later discuss the trainings for Alert, with the former planning to hire British military officer Col. Wilfred Wood to help with the program.

Cast 
Ned Beatty as Edward C. Acker
Peter Boyle as Fred Ford
Harry Ditson as Martin Shugrue
Vincent Gardenia as Harry Pizer
Timothy West as Col. Wilfred Wood
Michael Wincott as Ulrich Weber
Sean Pertwee as Oliver Koch
Richard Howard as Berndt Meyer
Michael Cronin as Martin Hübner
Stephen Hoye as Tommy Dome
Emma Martin as Beate Franzki
Sasson Gabai as Marwan Khreesat
Aharon Ipalé as Hafez Dalkomoni
Tony Alleff as Abdel Fatteh Ghadanfar
Tariq Alibai as Abu Talb
Cherif Ezzeldin as Saleem
Colin Stinton as Raymond Smith
Garrick Hagon as Mark Sanna
Mozaffar Shafeie as Ali Akbar Mohteshemi
William Roberts as Capt. Jim McQuarrie
Andrew Robertson as ATC Alan Topp
Moshe Ivgy as Yossi Langotsky

References

External links
 

1990 television films
1990 films
American drama television films
British drama television films
1990 drama films
HBO Films films
Pan Am Flight 103
Films set in 1988
1990s English-language films
1990s American films
1990s British films